Emile Deering Barnes (December 25, 1904  – July 3, 1959) was an American outfielder in Major League Baseball who played from 1927 through 1930 for the Washington Senators and Chicago White Sox. Listed at 5' 10", 158 lb., Barnes batted left handed and threw right handed. He was born in Suggsville, Alabama. His cousin, Sam Barnes, also played in the majors.

Barnes posted a .269 batting average in 286 career games. In between, he played in the Minor Leagues in all or parts of 14 seasons spanning 1927–1994, hitting .269 with 100 home runs in 1,413 games.

Besides, Barnes was a quarterback for Wallace Wade's Alabama Crimson Tide football teams, starting in the 1927 Rose Bowl.

Barnes died in 1959 in Mobile, Alabama, at the age of 54.

Sources

External links
, or Retrosheet
 

1904 births
1959 deaths
Alabama Crimson Tide baseball players
Alabama Crimson Tide football players
All-Southern college football players
American football quarterbacks
Atlanta Crackers players
Baseball players from Alabama
Birmingham Barons players
Charlotte Hornets (baseball) players
Chicago White Sox players
Clarksdale Red Sox players
Danville Leafs players
Danville-Scholfield Leafs players
Deaths from lymphoma
Little Rock Travelers players
Major League Baseball outfielders
Middletown Red Sox players
Minor league baseball managers
Oneonta Indians players
People from Clarke County, Alabama
Players of American football from Alabama
Rocky Mount Red Sox players
University of Alabama alumni
Washington Senators (1901–1960) players
Deaths from cancer in Alabama